Tara Hanlon (born 15 May 1998) is an Irish rower.

A native of Cork, she studied a Bachelor of Commerce at University College Cork, where she received a Quercus scholarship.

She won a silver medal in the coxless four event at the 2022 European Rowing Championships.

References

External links
 Tara Hanlon on World Rowing

1998 births
Living people
Irish female rowers
21st-century Irish women
20th-century Irish women
Alumni of University College Cork